The Chaplin baronetcy, of the Inner Temple, London, was a title in the Baronetage of Great Britain. It was created on 19 September 1715 for Robert Chaplin, Member of Parliament for Grimsby, with remainder to his nephew, Porter Chaplin. Chaplin was the son of Sir Francis Chaplin, Lord Mayor of London from 1677 to 1678. He was succeeded according to the special remainder by his great-nephew, John Chaplin, the son of the aforementioned Porter Chaplin, who had died in 1719. The title became extinct on John's death in 1730.

Thomas Chaplin, brother of Porter Chaplin, was the ancestor of the Viscounts Chaplin.

Chaplin baronets, of the Inner Temple (1715)

Sir Robert Chaplin, 1st Baronet (died 1726)
Sir John Chaplin, 2nd Baronet (died 1730)

See also
Viscount Chaplin

References

Extinct baronetcies in the Baronetage of Great Britain
Baronetcies created with special remainders
1715 establishments in Great Britain